To the Nines is the sixth studio album by the Danish melodeath/thrash metal band Hatesphere. To the Nines peaked at number 36 on the Tracklisten, the Danish top 40 record chart.

Track listing

Personnel 
 Peter "Pepe" Lyse Hansen - rhythm guitar
 Mixen Lindberg - bass guitar
 Dennis Buhl - drums
 Jakob Nyholm - lead guitar
 Jonathan "Joller" Albrechtsen - vocals

Release dates

23.03 – Denmark
25.03 – Finland & Spain
27.03 – GSA, Benelux, Sweden, France, Italy
30.03 – Europe
07.04 – North America

References 

2009 albums
Hatesphere albums
Napalm Records albums